Sextonia is a neotropical genus of plants in the family Lauraceae, native to South America. There are two species. They grow in moist forest from 900 to 1600 m.

The flowers are hermaphrodite. Occurring in Northern South America: Bolivia, Peru, Colombia, Ecuador, Venezuela, Guyana, Surinam, French Guiana and Brazil: in the river valleys of Amapa, Maranhao and Para. In the Caribbean area: Trinidad and Tobago.

Species
The genus contains the following species:
 Sextonia rubra, common name red louro
 Sextonia pubescens

References

Lauraceae genera
Flora of South America
Lauraceae